is a Japanese actor. He played Ichigo Kurosaki in the rock musical Bleach.

Television dramas
 Gokusen (2002) (Guest star)
 Water Boys (2003)
 Genseishin Justiriser (2004–2005)
 Tumbling (Film) (2010)

Stage
 Rock Musical Bleach - Ichigo Kurosaki

References

1985 births
Living people
Japanese male actors